Mellor Village and Mounds Archeological District, also known as Site 23CP1, is a historic archaeological site and national historic district located in the Lamine township, Cooper County, Missouri.  It is a Middle Woodland Period village site situated on a terrace in the Lamine River locality of the Missouri River Valley. The pottery and stone tools from the site belong to the technological/artistic tradition that is described as "Hopewell."

It was listed on the National Register of Historic Places in 1969 with a boundary increase in 1974.

See also 
 Imhoff Archeological Site
 National Register of Historic Places listings in Cooper County, Missouri

References

Historic districts on the National Register of Historic Places in Missouri
Archaeological sites on the National Register of Historic Places in Missouri
National Register of Historic Places in Cooper County, Missouri
Mounds in Missouri
Former populated places in Missouri
Hopewellian peoples
Middle Woodland period